Eldon Edge (March 15, 1926 – November 29, 2012) was an American politician who served in the Texas House of Representatives from the 45th district from 1985 to 1991.

He died on November 29, 2012, in Portland, Texas at age 86.

References

1926 births
2012 deaths
Democratic Party members of the Texas House of Representatives